An election to Ceredigion County Council was held on 3 May 2012 along with elections to 20 of the other 21 local authorities in Wales (all except Anglesey), community council elections in Wales and other elections elsewhere in the United Kingdom. It was followed by the 2017 election.

All 42 council seats were up for election. The previous council was controlled by Independents in coalition with the Liberal Democrat group and the single Labour member. Since 2008, there had been two by-elections in Aberystwyth, Rheidol and Ciliau Aeron which were both won by Plaid Cymru. The composition of the council prior to the elections was:

 Plaid Cymru 20
 Independents 12
 Liberal Democrats 9
 Labour 1

Councillors elected in this election are to serve an extended five-year term, after local government minister Carl Sargeant announced the next elections would be moved from 2016 to 2017 to avoid clashing with the next Welsh Assembly election in 2016 (which in turn had been delayed a year to avoid clashing with the next general election).

Election results: overview

|-bgcolor=#F6F6F6
| colspan=2 style="text-align: right; margin-right: 1em" | Total
| style="text-align: right;" | 42
| colspan=5 |
| style="text-align: right;" | 26,718
| style="text-align: right;" | 
|-
|}

The Independent statistics are for all Independents, whether they are members of the Independent group on the council or not.

Following the election, no party was left with a majority (22 seats) on the council. Plaid Cymru won a total of 19 seats, the Liberal Democrats won 7, Labour retained their single member, and the remaining seats were won by Independent candidates.

The leader of the Independent group on the council - Keith Evans - lost his seat to Plaid Cymru. As a result, Ray Quant (Councillor for Borth) was elected as the leader of a group of 12 of the independent councillors. Negotiations were held between the various groups, and eventually a coalition between Plaid Cymru, the one Labour councillor and a number of independent councillors was agreed upon. The Liberal Democrat group now form the opposition.

Candidates
For a total of 42 seats, Plaid Cymru were fielding 34 candidates, the Liberal Democrats were fielding 28 candidates, 22 candidates were standing as Independents, the Conservatives were fielding 21 candidates, while Labour were fielding just one. The Green Party were not fielding any candidates in this election, compared to two candidates in 2008.

Ward results
Asterisks denote incumbent Councillors seeking re-election.
Vote share changes compared with corresponding 2008 election.

Aberaeron ward

Aberporth ward

Aberystwyth, Bronglais ward

Aberystwyth, Central ward

Aberystwyth, North ward

Aberystwyth, Penparcau ward

Aberystwyth, Rheidol ward

In 2008, Rheidol ward was won by the Liberal Democrats. It was then won by Aled Davies for Plaid Cymru in a by-election. Davies then left Plaid Cymru in 2012 to stand as an Independent candidate. The vote changes here compare this election to the 2008 election.

Beulah ward

Borth ward

Capel Dewi ward

In 2008, the election in Capel Dewi ward was won unopposed by Peter Davies.

Cardigan, Mwldan ward

Cardigan, Rhydyfwuch ward

Cardigan, Teifi ward

Ceulanamaesmawr ward

Ciliau Aeron ward

Faenor ward

Lampeter ward

Llanarth ward

In 2008, the election in Llanarth ward was won by the unopposed Liberal Democrat candidate.

Llanbadarn Fawr, Padarn ward

Llanbadarn Fawr, Sulien ward

Llandyfriog ward

Llandysiliogogo ward

Llandysul Town ward

Llanfarian ward

Llanfihangel Ystrad ward

Llangeitho ward

In 2008, the election in Llangeitho ward was won by an unopposed Plaid Cymru candidate.

Llangybi ward

Llanrhystud ward

The independent candidate in 2008 received 34.73% of the vote, giving an Independent vote change of -10.06%.

Llansantffraed ward

Llanwenog ward

Lledrod ward

Melindwr ward

New Quay ward

Penbryn ward

Penparc ward

Tirymynach ward

Trefeurig ward

The independent candidate in 2008 received 14.82% of the vote, giving an Independent vote change of +43.63%.

Tregaron ward

Catherine Hughes also won the election unopposed for Plaid Cymru in 2008.

Troedyraur ward

The independent candidate in 2008 received 71.62% of the vote, giving an Independent vote change of -3.89%.

Ystwyth ward

References

2012 Welsh local elections
2012
21st century in Ceredigion